× Oncostele, abbreviated Ons., is a hybrid genus of orchids, used for greges containing at least one ancestor species from the genera Oncidium (Onc.) and Rhynchostele (Rst.).  The nothogenus was defined in 2003 by J. M. H. Shaw.

Greges 
Over 500 greges have been registered in × Oncostele. The grex Midnight Miracles has two cultivars, 'Masai Red' and 'Masai Splash', that have gained the Royal Horticultural Society's Award of Garden Merit.

Primary 
The genus × Oncostele contains the following primary hybrids:
 Ons. Black Beauty, Santa Barbara (1988) = Rst. bictoniense × Onc. leucochilum
 Ons. Elske Stolze, L.Stolze (1978) = Onc. sotoanum × Rst. bictoniensis (basionym: Odontocidium)
 Ons. Feathers, Woodland (2006) = Onc. maculatum × Rst. rossii
 Ons. Rustic Bridge, Rod McLellan Co. (1981) = Onc. fuscatum × Rst. ureskinneri

Non-primary 
 Ons. Wildcat = Ons. Rustic Bridge × Onc. Crowborough,  which has gained the Royal Horticultural Society's Award of Garden Merit.

Formerly 
 Cus. Compadre Juan Manzur, S.Cusi (2007) =  Cauc. phalaenopsis (syn. Onc. phalaenopsis) × Rst. rossii

References 

Orchid nothogenera
Oncidiinae